Muellerella hospitans is a species of lichenicolous fungus in the family Verrucariaceae. It is known to infect the lichen Bacidia rubella.

References

Verrucariales
Fungi described in 1863
Lichenicolous fungi
Taxa named by Ernst Stizenberger